St John the Evangelist's Church is in Hollow Lane, Kingsley, Cheshire, England.  It is an active Anglican parish church in the deanery of Frodsham, the archdeaconry of Chester,  and the diocese of Chester.  Its benefice is united with those of Christ Church, Crowton, and St John the Evangelist, Norley.  The church is recorded in the National Heritage List for England as a designated Grade II listed building.  It was a Commissioners' church, having received a grant towards its construction from the Church Building Commission.

History

The church was built in 1849–50 to a design by George Gilbert Scott.  A grant of £150 was given towards its construction by the Church Building Commission.

Architecture

St John's is constructed in red sandstone rubble, and has grey slate roofs.  Its architectural style is that of the late 13th century.  The plan consists of a nave with a south porch and a short north aisle, a chancel with a north sacristy, and a west tower with a spire.  The tower is embraced by two chambers that are not part of the aisle.  The tower rises for a single stage above the nave; it has angle buttresses, triangular bell openings with tracery consisting of three circles, and a corbel table.  The spire is splay-footed, with lucarnes on the cardinal sides, and clock faces on three of the oblique sides.  The windows are lancets containing Geometric tracery.

Inside the church is a timber three-bay arcade.  At the west end is a baptistry with an octagonal font.  The reredos is in stone with polished granite columns.  The wrought iron screen is dated 1913.  The stained glass in the east window, dating from 1880, is by Clayton and Bell.  The church has an electronic organ that replaced a former pipe organ made by Harrison & Harrison.

See also

List of new churches by George Gilbert Scott in Northern England
Listed buildings in Kingsley, Cheshire

References

Church of England church buildings in Cheshire
Grade II listed churches in Cheshire
Churches completed in 1850
19th-century Church of England church buildings
Diocese of Chester
Commissioners' church buildings